Oltinkoʻl is a village in Andijan Region, Uzbekistan. It is administrative center of Oltinkoʻl District. The village population in 1989 was 3,697 people.

References

Populated places in Andijan Region